The 1992 Ohio Bobcats football team was an American football team that represented Ohio University in the Mid-American Conference (MAC) during the 1992 NCAA Division I-A football season. In their third season under head coach Tom Lichtenberg, the Bobcats compiled a 1–10 record (1–7 against MAC opponents), finished in a tie for last place in the MAC, and were outscored by all opponents by a combined total of 253 to 145.  They played their home games in Peden Stadium in Athens, Ohio.

Schedule

References

Ohio
Ohio Bobcats football seasons
Ohio Bobcats football